This is a list of published International Organization for Standardization (ISO) standards and other deliverables. For a complete and up-to-date list of all the ISO standards, see the ISO catalogue.

The standards are protected by copyright and most of them must be purchased. However, about 300 of the standards produced by ISO and IEC's Joint Technical Committee 1 (JTC 1) have been made freely and publicly available.

ISO 26000 – ISO 26999
 ISO 26000:2010 Guidance on social responsibility
 ISO 26101:2017 Acoustics – Test methods for the qualification of free-field environments
 ISO/TR 26122:2008 Information and documentation - Work process analysis for records
 ISO 26162 Management of terminology resources — Terminology databases
 ISO 26162-1:2019 Part 1: Design
 ISO 26162-2:2019 Part 2: Software
 ISO 26243:2007 Cards for staple fibres spinning – Vocabulary and principles of construction
 ISO 26261 Fireworks – Category 4
 ISO 26261-1:2017 Part 1: Terminology
 ISO 26262 Road Vehicles - Functional Safety
 ISO 26322 Tractors for agriculture and forestry - Safety
 ISO 26322-1:2008 Part 1: Standard tractors
 ISO 26322-2:2010 Part 2: Narrow-track and small tractors
 ISO/IEC 26300:2006 Information technology – Open Document Format for Office Applications (OpenDocument) v1.0
 ISO 26324:2012 Information and documentation - Digital object identifier system
 ISO 26362:2009 Access panels in market, opinion and social research - Vocabulary and service requirements
 ISO 26428 Digital cinema (D-cinema) distribution master
 ISO 26428-1:2008 Part 1: Image characteristics
 ISO 26428-2:2008 Part 2: Audio characteristics
 ISO 26428-3:2008 Part 3: Audio channel mapping and channel labeling
 ISO 26428-9:2009 Part 9: Image pixel structure level 3 - Serial digital interface signal formatting
 ISO 26428-11:2011 Part 11: Additional frame rates
 ISO 26428-19:2011 Part 19: Serial digital interface signal formatting for additional frame rates level AFR2 and level AFR4
 ISO 26429 Digital cinema (D-cinema) packaging
 ISO 26429-3:2008 Part 3: Sound and picture track file
 ISO 26429-4:2008 Part 4: MXF JPEG 2000 application
 ISO 26429-6:2008 Part 6: MXF track file essence encryption
 ISO 26429-7:2008 Part 7: Composition playlist
 ISO 26429-8:2009 Part 8: Packing list
 ISO 26429-9:2009 Part 9: Asset mapping and file segmentation
 ISO 26429-10:2009 Part 10: Stereoscopic picture track file
 ISO 26430 Digital cinema (D-cinema) operations
 ISO 26430-1:2008 Part 1: Key delivery message
 ISO 26430-2:2008 Part 2: Digital certificate
 ISO 26430-3:2008 Part 3: Generic extra-theater message format
 ISO 26430-4:2009 Part 4: Log record format specification
 ISO 26430-5:2009 Part 5: Security log event class and constraints
 ISO 26430-6:2009 Part 6: Auditorium security messages for intra-theater communications
 ISO 26430-9:2009 Part 9: Key delivery bundle
 ISO 26433:2009 Digital cinema (D-cinema) - XML data types
 ISO/IEC/IEEE 26511:2011 Systems and software engineering - Requirements for managers of user documentation
 ISO/IEC/IEEE 26512:2011 Systems and software engineering - Requirements for acquirers and suppliers of user documentation
 ISO/IEC 26513:2009 Systems and software engineering - Requirements for testers and reviewers of user documentation
 ISO/IEC 26514:2008 Systems and software engineering - Requirements for designers and developers of user documentation
 ISO/IEC/IEEE 26515:2011 Systems and software engineering - Developing user documentation in an agile environment
 ISO/IEC/IEEE 26531:2015 Systems and software engineering - Content management for product life-cycle, user and service management documentation
 ISO/IEC 26550:2015 Software and systems engineering - Reference model for product line engineering and management
 ISO/IEC 26551:2016 Software and systems engineering - Tools and methods for product line requirements engineering
 ISO/IEC 26555:2015 Software and systems engineering - Tools and methods for product line technical management
 ISO/IEC 26557:2016 Software and systems engineering - Methods and tools for variability mechanisms in software and systems product line
 ISO/IEC 26558:2017 Software and systems engineering - Methods and tools for variability modelling in software and systems product line
 ISO/IEC 26559:2017 Software and systems engineering - Methods and tools for variability traceability in software and systems product line
 ISO 26683 Intelligent transport systems – Freight land conveyance content identification and communication
 ISO 26683-1:2013 Part 1: Context, architecture and referenced standards
 ISO 26683-2:2013 Part 2: Application interface profiles
 ISO 26684:2015 Intelligent transport systems (ITS) – Cooperative intersection signal information and violation warning systems (CIWS) – Performance requirements and test procedures
 ISO 26722:2014 Water treatment equipment for haemodialysis applications and related therapies
 ISO 26782:2009 Anaesthetic and respiratory equipment – Spirometers intended for the measurement of time forced expired volumes in humans
 ISO 26800:2011 Ergonomics - General approach, principles and concepts
 ISO 26824:2013 Particle characterization of particulate systems - Vocabulary
 ISO 26825:2008 Anaesthetic and respiratory equipment – User-applied labels for syringes containing drugs used during anaesthesia – Colours, design and performance
 ISO/IEC TR 26905:2006 Information technology – Telecommunications and information exchange between systems – Enterprise Communication in Next Generation Corporate Networks (NGCN) involving Public Next Generation Networks (NGN)
 ISO 26906:2015 Hydrometry – Fishpasses at flow measurement structures
 ISO/IEC 26907:2009 Information technology – Telecommunications and information exchange between systems – High-rate ultra-wideband PHY and MAC standard
 ISO/IEC 26908:2009 Information technology – Telecommunications and information exchange between systems – MAC-PHY interface for ISO/IEC 26907
 ISO 26909:2009 Springs - Vocabulary
 ISO/IEC 26925:2009 Information technology - Data interchange on 120 mm and 80 mm optical disk using +RW HS format - Capacity: 4,7 Gbytes and 1,46 Gbytes per side (recording speed 8X)
 ISO/IEC TR 26927:2011 Information technology – Telecommunications and information exchange between systems – Corporate telecommunication networks – Mobility for enterprise communications
 ISO/TR 26999:2012 Intelligent transport systems – Systems architecture – Use of process-oriented methodology in ITS International Standards and other deliverables

ISO 27000 – ISO 27999

 ISO/IEC 27000:2016 Information technology – Security techniques – Information security management systems – Overview and vocabulary
 ISO/IEC 27001:2013 Information technology – Security techniques – Information security management systems – Requirements
 ISO/IEC 27002:2022 Information technology – Security techniques – Code of practice for information security controls
 ISO/IEC 27003:2017 Information technology – Security techniques – Information security management systems – Guidance
 ISO/IEC 27004:2016 Information technology – Security techniques – Information security management – Monitoring, measurement, analysis and evaluation
 ISO/IEC 27005:2018 Information technology – Security techniques – Information security risk management
 ISO/IEC 27006:2015 Information technology – Security techniques – Requirements for bodies providing audit and certification of information security management systems
 ISO/IEC 27007:2017 Information technology – Security techniques – Guidelines for information security management systems auditing
 ISO/IEC TR 27008:2011 Information technology – Security techniques – Guidelines for auditors on information security controls
 ISO/IEC 27009:2016 Information technology – Security techniques – Sector-specific application of ISO/IEC 27001 – Requirements
 ISO/IEC 27010:2015 Information technology – Security techniques – Information security management for inter-sector and inter-organizational communications
 ISO/IEC 27011:2016 Information technology – Security techniques – Code of practice for Information security controls based on ISO/IEC 27002 for telecommunications organizations
 ISO/IEC 27013:2015 Information technology - Security techniques - Guidance on the integrated implementation of ISO/IEC 27001 and ISO/IEC 20000-1
 ISO/IEC 27014:2013 Information technology - Security techniques - Governance of information security
 ISO/IEC TR 27016:2014 Information technology - Security techniques - Information security management - Organizational economics
 ISO/IEC 27017:2015 Information technology - Security techniques - Code of practice for information security controls based on ISO/IEC 27002 for cloud services
 ISO/IEC 27018:2019 Information technology - Security techniques - Code of practice for protection of personally identifiable information (PII) in public clouds acting as PII processors
 ISO/IEC 27019:2017 Information technology - Security techniques - Information security management guidelines based on ISO/IEC 27002 for process control systems specific to the energy utility industry
 ISO/IEC TR 27023:2015 Information technology - Security techniques - Mapping the revised editions of ISO/IEC 27001 and ISO/IEC 27002
 ISO/IEC 27031:2011 Information technology - Security techniques - Guidelines for information and communication technology readiness for business continuity
 ISO/IEC 27032:2012 Information technology - Security techniques - Guidelines for cybersecurity
 ISO/IEC 27033 Information technology - Security techniques - Network security
 ISO/IEC 27033-1:2015 Part 1: Overview and concepts
 ISO/IEC 27033-2:2012 Part 2: Guidelines for the design and implementation of network security
 ISO/IEC 27033-3:2010 Part 3: Reference networking scenarios - Threats, design techniques and control issues
 ISO/IEC 27033-4:2014 Part 4: Securing communications between networks using security gateways
 ISO/IEC 27033-5:2013 Part 5: Securing communications across networks using Virtual Private Networks (VPNs) 
 ISO/IEC 27033-6:2016 Part 6: Securing wireless IP network access
 ISO/IEC 27034 Information technology - Security techniques - Application security
 ISO/IEC 27034-1:2011 Part 1: Overview and concepts
 ISO/IEC 27034-2:2015 Part 2: Organization normative framework
 ISO/IEC 27034-6:2016 Part 6: Case studies
 ISO/IEC 27035 Information technology - Security techniques - Information security incident management
 ISO/IEC 27035-1:2016 Part 1: Principles of incident management
 ISO/IEC 27035-2:2016 Part 2: Guidelines to plan and prepare for incident response
 ISO/IEC 27036 Information technology - Security techniques - Information security for supplier relationships
 ISO/IEC 27036-1:2014 Part 1: Overview and concepts 
 ISO/IEC 27036-2:2014 Part 2: Requirements
 ISO/IEC 27036-3:2013 Part 3: Guidelines for information and communication technology supply chain security
 ISO/IEC 27036-4:2016 Part 4: Guidelines for security of cloud services
 ISO/IEC 27037:2012 Information technology – Security techniques – Guidelines for identification, collection, acquisition and preservation of digital evidence
 ISO/IEC 27038:2014 Information technology - Security techniques - Specification for digital redaction
 ISO/IEC 27039:2015 Information technology - Security techniques - Selection, deployment and operations of intrusion detection and prevention systems (IDPS)
 ISO/IEC 27040:2015 Information technology - Security techniques - Storage security
 ISO/IEC 27041:2015 Information technology - Security techniques - Guidance on assuring suitability and adequacy of incident investigative method
 ISO/IEC 27042:2015 Information technology - Security techniques - Guidelines for the analysis and interpretation of digital evidence
 ISO/IEC 27043:2015 Information technology - Security techniques - Incident investigation principles and processes
 ISO/IEC 27050 Information technology - Security techniques - Electronic discovery
 ISO/IEC 27050-1:2016 Part 1: Overview and concepts
 ISO 27185:2012 Cardiac rhythm management devices - Symbols to be used with cardiac rhythm management device labels, and information to be supplied - General requirements
 ISO 27186:2010 Active implantable medical devices – Four-pole connector system for implantable cardiac rhythm management devices – Dimensional and test requirements
 ISO 27327 Fans – Air curtain units
 ISO 27327-2:2014 Part 2: Laboratory methods of testing for sound power
 ISO 27427:2013 Anaesthetic and respiratory equipment – Nebulizing systems and components
 ISO 27500:2016 The human-centred organization — Rationale and general principles
 ISO/TS 27527:2010 Health informatics – Provider identification
 ISO 27668 Gel ink ball pens and refills
 ISO 27668-1:2017 Part 1: General use
 ISO 27668-2:2009 Part 2: Documentary use (DOC)
 ISO/TS 27687:2008 Nanotechnologies – Terminology and definitions for nano-objects – Nanoparticle, nanofibre and nanoplate [Withdrawn: replaced with ISO/TS 80004-2:2015]
ISO/IEC 27701:2019 Security techniques — Extension to ISO/IEC 27001 and ISO/IEC 27002 for privacy information management — Requirements and guidelines
 ISO 27729:2012 Information and documentation - International standard name identifier (ISNI)
 ISO 27730:2012 Information and documentation - International standard collection identifier (ISCI)
 ISO 27789:2013 Health informatics – Audit trails for electronic health records
 ISO/TS 27790:2009 Health informatics – Document registry framework
 ISO 27799:2016 Health informatics—Information security management in health using ISO/IEC 27002
 ISO/TR 27809:2007 Health informatics – Measures for ensuring patient safety of health software
 ISO/HL7 27931:2009 Data Exchange Standards – Health Level Seven Version 2.5 – An application protocol for electronic data exchange in healthcare environments
 ISO/HL7 27932:2009 Data Exchange Standards – HL7 Clinical Document Architecture, Release 2
 ISO/HL7 27951:2009 Health informatics – Common terminology services, release 1
 ISO/HL7 27953 Health informatics – Individual case safety reports (ICSRs) in pharmacovigilance
 ISO/HL7 27953-1:2011 Part 1: Framework for adverse event reporting
 ISO/HL7 27953-2:2011 Part 2: Human pharmaceutical reporting requirements for ICSR
 ISO 27991:2008 Ships and marine technology - Marine evacuation systems - Means of communication

Notes

References

External links 
 International Organization for Standardization
 ISO Certification Provider
 ISO Consultant

International Organization for Standardization